To Be Read at Dusk (1852) is a short story written by Charles Dickens, and was first published in Heath's Keepsake.

References 

1852 short stories
Short stories by Charles Dickens